Michael Sinelnikoff (born 1 August 1928) is a British actor. He is known for his role as Professor Arthur Summerlee on the television series Sir Arthur Conan Doyle's The Lost World, and has been seen in a variety of film roles such as 300 and The Greatest Game Ever Played.

Filmography

Film

Television

References

External links 

English male film actors
1928 births
Living people
English male television actors